The Chicago EP is an EP album by Mat Kearney released in 2005 on Aware/Columbia Records to promote his then upcoming album Nothing Left to Lose (2006). It is a rare item and is now out of print.

Track listing
"Nothing Left to Lose" – 4:24
"Undeniable" – 4:25
"Chicago" [Acoustic Version] – 4:16
"Girl America" [Acoustic Version] – 4:17
"In The Middle" [Acoustic Version] – 4:03

Notes
Although "Chicago" is an acoustic version, there has been no studio version released. It is believed there was a studio version recorded for Nothing Left to Lose but was cut from the album.

External links
Mat Kearney - official site

2005 EPs